Linkou County is a county in the southeast of Heilongjiang Province, China. It is under the jurisdiction of the prefecture-level city of Mudanjiang.

Administrative divisions 
Linkou County is divided into 11 towns. 
11 towns
 Linkou, Gucheng, Diaoling, Zhujia, Liushu, Sandaotong, Longzhua, Lianhua, Qingshan, Jiantang and Kuishan

Demographics 

Climate

References

External links 
www.hljmzt.gov.cn/

Administrative subdivisions of Heilongjiang
Mudanjiang